This is a list of media outlets that were shut down in the course of the 2016 Turkish purges.

On 27 July 2016, President Recep Tayyip Erdoğan shut down 16 television channels, 23 radio stations, 45 daily newspapers, 15 magazines and 29 publishing houses in another emergency decree under the newly adopted emergency legislation. In October 2016 the Turkish government issued another decree which closed further news outlets. According to the European Federation of Journalists, 168 media outlets have been shut down during the state of emergency following the coup d'état attempt in July 2016.

News agencies 
The following four news agencies were shut down in July 2016:
 Cihan News Agency
 Muhabir News Agency
 SEM News Agency
 Urfa News Agency
Closed in October 2016:
 Dicle News Agency (DİHA) 
 Jin News Agency

Newspapers 
The following newspapers were shut down:
Closed in July 2016:

 Adana Haber
 Adana Medya
 Akdeniz Türk
 Şuhut’un Sesi
 Kurtuluş
 Lider
 İscehisar
 Durum
 Türkeli
 Antalya
 Yerel Bakış
 Nazar
 Batman
 Batman Postası
 Batman Doğuş
 Bingöl Olay
 İrade
 İskenderun Olay
 Ekonomi
 Ege’de Son Söz
 Demokrat Gebze
 Kocaeli Manşet
 Bizim Kocaeli
 Haber Kütahya
 Gediz
 Zafer
 Hisar
 Turgutlu Havadis
 Milas Feza
 Türkiye’de Yeni Yıldız
 Hakikat
 Ajans 11
 Yeni Emek
 Banaz Postası
 Son Nokta
 Merkür Haber

 Bugün
 
 
 Taraf
 Yarına Bakış
 Yeni Hayat
 Zaman
 Today's Zaman

Closed in October 2016:

 Özgür Gündem
 Azadiya Welat
 Batman Çağdaş
 Cizre Postası 
 Güney Express 
 İdil Haber
 Kızıltepe’nin Sesi
 Prestij Haber
 Urfanatik
 Yüksekova Haber

Magazines
The following magazines were shut down:
Closed in July 2016
 Akademik Araştırmalar
 Aksiyon
 Asya Pasifik
 Bisiklet Çocuk
 
 Ekolife
 Ekoloji
 Fountain
 
 Gül Yaprağı
 Nokta
 Sızıntı
 Turkish Left
 Yağmur
 Yeni Ümit
 Zirve

Closed in October 2016:
' 'Tiroji 
 Özgürlük Dünyası 
 Evrensel Kültür''

Publishers
The following publishers were shut down:

 Altınburç
 Burak Basın Yayın Dağıtım
 Define
 Dolunay Eğitim Yayın Dağıtım
 Giresun Basın Yayın Dağıtım
 Gonca
 Gülyurdu
 GYV
 Işık Akademi
 Işık Özel Eğitim
 İklim Basın Yayın Pazarlama
 Kaydırak
 Kaynak
 Kervan Basın Yayıncılık
 Kuşak
 Muştu
 Nil
 Rehber
 Sürat Basım Yayın Reklamcılık Eğitim Araçları
 Sütun
 Şahdamar
 Ufuk Basın Yayın Haber Ajans Pazarlama
 Ufuk
 Waşanxaneya Nil
 Yay Basın Dağıtım
 Yeni Akademi
 Yitik Hazine
 Zambak Basın Yayın Eğitim Turizm

TV stations
The following sixteen television stations were shut down:

 Barış TV
 
 Can Erzincan TV
 
 
 
 Kanal 124
 Kanaltürk
 
 Mehtap TV
 Merkür TV
 Samanyolu Haber
 Samanyolu TV
 SRT TV
 
 Yumurcak TV

Radio stations
The following radio stations were shut down:

 Aksaray Mavi
 Aktüel
 Berfin
 
 
 Esra
 Haber Radyo Ege
 Herkül
 Jest
 
 
 Radyo Aile Rehberi
 Radyo Bamteli
 
 Radyo Fıkıh
 Radyo Küre
 
 Radyo Nur
 Radyo Şemşik
 
 Umut
 Yağmur

References

External links
  (Full list of institutions shut down on 27 July 2016)

Shut down
2016–17 purges in Turkey